Imma costipuncta is a moth of the family Immidae. It is known from Ambon Island of Indonesia.

The wingspan is 20–21 mm. The forewings are rather dark fuscous, slightly purplish-tinged and with a hardly darker cloudy discal dot at three-fifths and a whitish-ochreous triangular dot on the costa beyond the middle. There is a whitish-ochreous streak from the costa before the apex to the termen above the tornus, triangularly dilated towards the costa, confluent at the extremities with a toothed whitish-ochreous line along the termen. The hindwings are fuscous.

References

Immidae
Moths described in 1874
Moths of Indonesia